Auzatellodes arizana is a moth of the family Drepanidae first described by Wileman in 1911. It is found in Taiwan.

The wingspan is 23–29 mm. Adults are on wing from May to July.

References

Moths described in 1911
Drepaninae
Moths of Taiwan